Spider's Web is a 1982 British mystery television film directed by Basil Coleman and starring Penelope Keith, Robert Flemyng and Thorley Walters. It is an adaptation of the 1954 play of the same title by Agatha Christie, produced with very few alterations from the original dialogue.

Cast
 Penelope Keith as Clarissa Hailsham-Brown
 Robert Flemyng as Sir Rowland Delahaye
 Thorley Walters as Hugo Birch
 Elizabeth Spriggs as Mildred Peake
 David Yelland as Jeremy Warrender
 John Barcroft as Inspector Lord
 Holly Aird as	Pippa Hailsham-Brown
 Jonathan Newth as Henry Hailsham-Brown
 Brian Protheroe as Oliver Costello
 David Crosse as Elgin
 Mark Draper as Constable Jones
 Lee Fox as Doctor

References

Bibliography
 Aldridge, Mark. Agatha Christie on Screen. Springer, 2016.

External links
 

1982 television films
1982 films
British television films
British mystery films
BBC television dramas
1980s English-language films
1980s British films